Guedera is a place within Darfur in Sudan. It is a military training camp. Another military training camp in the area is at Dedengita.

External links 
 Amnesty International on camps in Sudan

Military training facilities
Military of Sudan